William Farley may refer to:

 William Farley (director), American film director
 William Farley (Medal of Honor) (1835–?), Union Navy sailor and Medal of Honor recipient
 William F. Farley (born 1942), owner of private equity firm Farley Industries
 William Wallace Farley (1874–1952), New York Democratic state chairman